Geoffrey Fryer  (born, Huddersfield, Yorkshire, 6 August 1927) is a British biologist.

Education

Huddersfield College, and University of London.

Personal life

Married Vivienne Hodgson, 1953.  One son [1961] and one daughter [1963].

Career

Deputy Chief Scientific Officer, Windermere Laboratory, Freshwater Biological Association 1981-1988. Honorary Professor, University of Lancaster since 1988.

Honours

He was elected a Fellow of the Royal Society in 1972. Awarded the Zoological Society of London Frink Medal in 1983 and the Linnean Medal in 1987.

Tribute
Fish named after Fryer:
The cichlid Alticorpus geoffreyi Snoeks & Walapa 2004
The Lake Malawi cichlid Sciaenochromis fryeri Konings, 1993

Selected publications

See also
:Category:Taxa named by Geoffrey Fryer

References 

1927 births
Living people
Fellows of the Royal Society
20th-century British biologists